Super Happy Fun Times Friends is the seventh studio album by Australian rock band Regurgitator, and was released in Australia on 5 August 2011. The album peaked at No. 91 on the ARIA Albums Chart.

Background and release
Regurgitator moved to Melbourne in 2010 and had planned on releasing individual songs on the internet as they were finished; with a number of tracks released throughout 2010. After being quiet for some months the band debuted a new song "One Day" on Triple J and announced the new album on 19 June 2011.

Track listing
"One Day" (Q. Yeomans) – 2:25
"Game Over Dude" (B. Ely) – 0:21
"All Fake Everything" (Q. Yeomans) – 4:26
"Super Happy Funtime" (B. Ely) – 1:46
"Punk Mum" (Q. Yeomans) – 2:15
"Be Still My Noisy Mind" (B. Ely) – 2:49
"D.M.T 4 2" (B. Ely) – 1:41
"No Show" (Q. Yeomans) – 3:14
"Uncontactable" (B. Ely) – 2:00
"Into the Night" (Q. Yeomans) – 3:04
"Devil Spell" (B. Ely) – 2:02
"Born Dumb" (Q. Yeomans) – 2:26
"Outer Space" (B. Ely) – 3:04
"8pm" (B. Ely) – 1:10

Charts

Release history

References

Regurgitator albums
2011 albums